Military Keynesianism is an economic policy based on the position that government should raise military spending to boost economic growth. It is a fiscal stimulus policy as advocated by John Maynard Keynes. But where Keynes advocated increasing public spending on socially useful items (infrastructure in particular), additional public spending is allocated to the arms industry, the area of defense being that over which the executive exercises greater discretionary power. Typical examples of such policies are Nazi Germany, or the United States during and after World War II, during the presidencies of Franklin D. Roosevelt and Harry S. Truman. This type of economy is linked to the interdependence between welfare and warfare states, in which the latter feeds the former, in a potentially unlimited spiral. The term is often used pejoratively to refer to politicians who apparently reject Keynesian economics, but use Keynesian arguments in support of excessive military spending.

Keynesian economics and application

The most direct economic criticism of military Keynesianism maintains that government expenditures on non-military public goods such as health care, education, mass transit, and infrastructure repair create more jobs than equivalent military expenditures.

Noam Chomsky, a critic of military Keynesianism, contends that military Keynesianism offers the state advantages over non-military Keynesianism. Specifically, military Keynesianism can be implemented with less public interest and participation. "Social spending may well arouse public interest and participation, thus enhancing the threat of democracy; the public cares about hospitals, roads, neighborhoods, and so on, but has no opinion about the choice of missiles and high-tech fighter planes." Essentially, when the public is less interested in the details of state spending, it affords the state increased discretion in how it spends money.

Nazi Germany 
Much of the Third Reich economy was oriented towards militarization, especially to prepare for a possible war with the Slavic nations, rather than in the production of consumer goods or towards commercial expansion. Nevertheless, the concentration of capital in the arms industry had favored a rapid expansion of German industrial capacity and helped to reduce unemployment rates.

United States 
In the United States this theory was applied during the Second World War, during the presidencies of Franklin Delano Roosevelt and Harry Truman, the latter with the document NSC-68. The influence of Military Keynesianism on US economic policy choices lasted until the Vietnam War. Keynesians maintain that government spending should first be used for useful purposes such as infrastructure investment, but that even non-useful spending may be helpful during recessions. John Maynard Keynes advocated that government spending could be used "in the interests of peace and prosperity" instead of "war and destruction". An example of such policies are the Public Works Administration in the 1930s in the United States.

Keynes' 1933 letter to Roosevelt
In 1933, John Maynard Keynes wrote an open letter to President Franklin Roosevelt urging the new president to borrow money to be spent on public works programs.

Barney Frank 
While the idea dates back to Keynes, a similar term is often attributed to Barney Frank, and seems to have been first used around funding the F-22 fighter:

Forms 
The following forms of military Keynesianism may be differentiated:
 First, there is the differentiation between the use of military spending as 'pump primer', and efforts to achieve long term multiplier effects by the given spending. A government may opt to approve the purchases of fighter planes, warships or other military commodities so as to weather a recession. Alternatively, it may opt to approve the purchase of fighter planes, warships or other military commodities throughout all the years of a given business cycle. Since the construction of large armament systems requires extensive planning and research, capitalist states generally prefer to rely on arms' purchases or other military allocations for longer-term macro-economic policymaking and regulation.
 A second differentiation that needs to be made is between primary and secondary forms of military Keynesianism. In both cases, the state uses the multiplier mechanism in order to stimulate aggregate demand in society. But the primary form of military Keynesianism refers to a situation where the state uses its military allocations as the principal means to drive the business cycle. In case of a secondary form of military Keynesianism, the given allocations contribute towards generating additional demand, but not to the extent that the economy is fully, or primarily, driven by the military allocations.
 The third differentiation starts from the observation that modern capitalist economies do not function as closed systems but rely on foreign trade and exports as outlets for the sale of a part of their surplus. This general observation applies to the surplus generated in the military sector as well. As the vast amount of data regarding state promotion of arms' exports do confirm, capitalist states actively try to ensure that their armament corporations gain access to import orders from foreign states, and they do so amongst others in order to generate multiplier effects. Hence, there is a need to also differentiate between the two forms of domestic and 'externalized' military Keynesianism.

Permanent war economy
The concept of permanent war economy originated in 1944 with an article by Ed Sard (alias Frank Demby, Walter S. Oakes and T.N. Vance), a theoretician who predicted a post-war arms race. He argued at the time that the United States would retain the character of a war economy; even in peacetime, US military expenditure would remain large, reducing the percentage of unemployed compared to the 1930s. He extended this analysis in 1950 and 1951.

Empirical estimates 
Many economists have attempted to estimate the multiplier effect of military expenditures with mixed results.  A meta-analysis of 42 primary studies with 243 estimates concluded that military expenditures tended to increase the economy in developed countries with military exports but decrease the economy in less developed countries with generally higher level of political corruption.

Externalities 
Externalities are rarely if ever considered in estimating a multiplier effect.  This can be a serious issue for military expenditures.  For example, the Islamic State of Iraq and the Levant (ISIL) relies mostly on captured weapons.  For example, in Mosul between 4 and 10 June 2014 a group of between 500 and 600 ISIL troops "were able to seize six divisions' worth of strategic weaponry, all of it US-supplied" from a force with a paper strength of 120,000 men. In considering the multiplier effect of military expenditures, the people killed and property destroyed are not considered.  The only things that are considered are the increased weapon sales to replace those stolen and the costs associated with combatting ISIL.  Those are considered as increasing the Gross Domestic Product of the United States, and that is assumed to be good.

See also 

Arms industry
Bernard Baruch
Cold War
Countercyclical
Employer of last resort
Iron triangle (US politics)
Keynesian economics
Lemon socialism
List of countries by military expenditures
Military budget of the United States
Military–industrial complex
Parable of the broken window
Perpetual war
Ultra-imperialism
War economy

Notes

References 
Walter S. Oakes, 1944, "Towards a Permanent Arms Economy?", Politics, February.
T. N. Vance, 1950, "After Korea What? An Economic Interpretation of U.S. Perspectives", New International, November–December.
T. N. Vance, 1951, "The Permanent Arms Economy", New International. [series of articles]
Charles Edward Wilson, "Army Ordnance (Vol. XXVI, No. 143, March–April 1944)".
Tony Cliff, Perspectives for the permanent war economy. Socialist Review March 1957. Reprint Tony Cliff, Marxist Theory after Trotsky. Selected Writings. Volume 3. Bookmarks London 2003. 
Chris Harman, Explaining the Crisis – A Marxist Re-Appraisal. Bookmarks London 1999. 
 Chris Harman, Analysing Imperialism International Socialism 99. Summer 2003.
Michael Kidron, Western Capitalism Since the War. Penguin Books Harmondsworth 1970.
Alfred Sohn-Rethel, Industrie und Nationalsozialismus. Aufzeichnungen aus dem “Mitteleuropäischen Wirtschaftstag”. Wagenbach-Verlag Berlin 1992. 
 Alfred Sohn-Rethel, Economy and class structure of German fascism London, CSE Books 1978.
Ernest Mandel, Late Capitalism. London: Verso, 1975.

External links 
 Cheap Wars by Jonathan Nitzan, Ph.D. Associate Professor of Political Economy, and Shimshon Bichler, Lecturer of Political Economy
 Defense Doesn't Need Stimulus by Christopher Preble, Ph.D. History
 Doesn't all the war spending stimulate the economy? And shouldn't the Bush tax cuts do the same? So why are we falling into recession? Dollars & Sense magazine
 Military Keynesianism to the Rescue? by Robert Higgs, Ph.D. Professor Emeritus of Economics
 Rich Nation, Strong Army: National Security and the Technological Transformation of Japan by Richard J. Samuels, Ph.D. Professor of Political Science
 The economic disaster that is military Keynesianism: Why the US has really gone broke by Dr.Chalmers Johnson in the English edition of Le Monde Diplomatique
 High Tech, A Subsidiary Of Pentagon Inc. by Robert B. Reich
 Macroeconomic Consequences of Peace: American Radical Economists and the Problem of Military Keynesianism, 1938–1975

Keynesian economics
Military–industrial complex
Macroeconomics
Keynesianism
Lobbying
Keynesianism
Economic history
Economic ideologies